The Complete Vinyl Collection is a box set release by Scottish alternative rock band, The Jesus and Mary Chain. It was released on 12 December 2013 via Demon Music Group, marking the band's 30th anniversary.

Contents
The box set includes the band's six studio albums, along with a live album:

Psychocandy (1985)
Darklands (1987)
Automatic (1989)
Honey’s Dead (1992)
Stoned & Dethroned (1994)
Munki (1998)
Live in Concert (2003)

The box set marks the first vinyl pressing of the band's live album Live in Concert, which contains live recordings from 1992 and 1995. Other items featured on the box set include a two-LP collection of "all" the band’s BBC studio recordings, a B-sides and rarities LP with a fan-picked track list, a 32-page hardcover book with photographs, essays and interviews, and a poster, for which fans were able to upload a photo of their face for inclusion.

The BBC sessions EPs contain studio recordings from 1984-1986, 1988-1989, 1994, and 1998.

Track listing
All songs written and composed by William Reid and Jim Reid, except where noted:
Psychocandy

Darklands

Automatic

Honey's Dead

Stoned & Dethroned

Munki

References

External links
The Jesus and Mary Chain - The Complete Vinyl Collection
30th anniversary B-sides & rarities LP voting

2013 compilation albums
The Jesus and Mary Chain compilation albums
Demon Music Group compilation albums